Jacques-Raymond Tremblay (31 August 1923 – 2 August 2012) was a Canadian politician.

Tremblay was born in Sorel, Quebec. He was a life underwriter by career.

He was elected in Richelieu—Verchères riding for the Liberal Party of Canada in a 29 May 1967 by-election. After serving the remaining term of the 27th Canadian Parliament, Tremblay left federal political office and did not campaign in the 1968 federal election. He became an assistant to the Minister of National Revenue from 1968 to 1969.

Tremblay turned to provincial politics, winning a seat in the Iberville riding and served one term as a Liberal member of the National Assembly of Quebec. He was elected in the 1973 election and defeated in 1976.

He should not be confused with Jacques Tremblay (no relation), who served in the same electoral district for the same political party from 1985 to 1989.

Tremblay died at Sorel-Tracy on 2 August 2012.

References

External links
 
 

1923 births
2012 deaths
Members of the House of Commons of Canada from Quebec
Liberal Party of Canada MPs
People from Sorel-Tracy
Quebec Liberal Party MNAs